Wendell Jones may refer to:
 Wendell E. Jones (1937–2011), American educator, businessman, and politician
 Wendell P. Jones (1866–1944), Canadian politician